Rico Steinmann (born 26 December 1967 in Karl-Marx-Stadt) is a German former professional footballer who played mostly as a midfielder.

He made 23 appearances for the East Germany national team from 1986 to 1990.

Steinmann played over 300 top-flight matches in (East) Germany and the Netherlands.

References

External links
 
 
 

1967 births
Living people
Sportspeople from Chemnitz
Association football midfielders
German footballers
East German footballers
Footballers from Saxony
East Germany international footballers
DDR-Oberliga players
Bundesliga players
Eredivisie players
Chemnitzer FC players
1. FC Köln players
FC Twente players
German football managers
German expatriate footballers
German expatriate sportspeople in the Netherlands
Expatriate footballers in the Netherlands